Beyond Entropy is a London-based non-profit limited company practicing architecture, urbanism, and cultural analysis. The company evolved from trans-disciplinary research at the Architectural Association School of Architecture, in London. The company was founded by Stefano Rabolli Pansera in 2009 as a collaborative practice operating public-private partnerships globally.  Beyond Entropy Ltd operates at the threshold between art, architecture, and geopolitics focusing on the notion of energy influencing form. Projects vary from art installations, to architectural master-planning, to public relations.

History 

Stefano Rabolli Pansera set up a cluster of research at the Architectural Association in 2009. The theme was “Beyond Entropy, when Energy becomes Form”. The research consisted in a collaboration between artists, scientists and architects to create a new discourse on the notion energy and its relationship to space beyond the rhetoric of sustainability. 
After a visit to the CERN Institute in Geneva and a series of workshops, lectures and symposia in London, eight prototypes were created and they were exhibited in a collateral event “Beyond Entropy When Energy becomes Form” at 12th Venice Architecture Biennale.
During the opening of the Biennale, Beyond Entropy organised a 12-hour-long presentation and debate on energy with world-leading intellectuals including Toni Negri, Judith Revel, Ricky Burdett, and Hans Ulrich Obrist. The exhibition ‘Beyond Entropy’ was shown at the Milan Triennale (May 2011) and at the Architecture Association, School of Architecture in London (June 2011).
After these exhibitions, Beyond Entropy evolved into an independent organisation that develops architectural, urban and curatorial projects in an effort to reveal a specific energetic understanding of territorial conditions based upon a specific method and approach.

Theoretical Approach 

The theoretical approach of Beyond Entropy refers to a notion of qualitative transformation that draws back to Gilles Deleuze’s notion of Becoming, to Aldo Rossi’s urban theory and to Pascal Schöning notion of Cinematic Architecture. The specific research of Beyond Entropy refers explicitly to some of the production of Arte Povera and Land Art. 
The prototypes in Venice were instrumental to reconfigure an architectural language articulated in five points:
 Energy as Form
 Energy as Brief
 Energy as Scale 
 Energy as Structure
 Energy as Representation

Territories 

Since 2012, Beyond Entropy operates globally in situations of territorial crisis.
Beyond Entropy has defined several regions of investigations: each region is analysed through a set of territorial problems that can be understood within the dialectics of energy and form, transformation and resistance, energy and entropy, matter and action.

Beyond Entropy is currently working in the urban sprawl of some of the most industrialized parts of the planet (Beyond Entropy Europe); in the derelict infrastructures of deserted islands and coastline of the Mediterranean (Beyond Entropy Mediterranean); the overcrowded urban areas of the cities in emerging countries (Beyond Entropy Africa). Furthermore Beyond Entropy has created a Publishing House (Beyond Entropy Publication) and a Radio (Beyond Entropy Radio) that are developed as territories themselves.

Beyond Entropy Africa 

In 2011, Stefano Rabolli Pansera and Paula Nascimento founded Beyond Entropy Africa, a limited company registered in Angola. Beyond Entropy Africa focuses on Luanda as the paradigm of the urban condition of the African Sub-Saharan region, a type of city that is defined by a lack of basic infrastructures and a high density of population. 
In 2012, Beyond Entropy Africa curated the Angola Pavilion at the 13th Architecture Biennale in Venice  entitled ‘Beyond Entropy Angola’. 
In 2013, Beyond Entropy Africa curated the Angola Pavilion at the 55th Art Biennale in Venice entitled ‘Luanda, Encyclopedic City’ featuring the work of photographer Chagas. The Pavilion received the Golden Lion for Best National Participation.

Beyond Entropy Mediterranean 

Beyond Entropy Mediterranean focuses on Sardinia as the paradigm of the Mediterranean Coastline, a region where irreconcilable territorial conditions coexist: natural reserve and touristic exploitation, large infrastructures and unspoiled islands, overcrowded coastlines during summer and deserted villages during winter.  Beyond Entropy Mediterranean focuses on the proposal of a Mediterranean Kunsthalle articulated around the Museum of Contemporary Art of Calasetta and the Open Air Gallery of Mangiabarche.

Beyond Entropy Europe 

Beyond Entropy Europe looks at the urban sprawl of Northern Italy as the privileged example of a condition where city and countryside are blurred into an entropic landscape. Through the systematic study of Palladian Villas as territorial catalysts, Beyond Entropy envisions a new form of occupation for this contemporary landscape.

Beyond Entropy Publication 

Beyond Entropy Publication was set up by Stefano Rabolli Pansera and Tankboys in 2013.
The books have been published are:
 Beyond Entropy when Prototype becomes Space, edited by Stefano Rabolli Pansera (2012)
 Focus II, Steve Bishop (2013)
 Luanda Encyclipedic City, Edson Chagas (2013)

Beyond Entropy Radio 

Beyond Entropy Radio was set up by Stefano Rabolli Pansera in 2013 in Calasetta, Sardinia.

Awards 

Golden Lion of the Venice Biennale of Art for the Best National Participation (Angola Pavilion) 2013

Selected Projects 

 Mangiabarche open-air gallery (2011)
 Angola Pavilion 13th International Architecture Exhibition La Biennale di Venezia (2012)
 Angola Pavilion 55th International Art Exhibition La Biennale di Venezia (2013)

Bibliography 
Beyond Entropy when Energy becomes Form  (2011) 
Beyond Entropy when Prototype becomes Space (2012)

References

External links 
  
 
 
 

Non-profit organisations based in the United Kingdom
Architecture organisations based in the United Kingdom